Minions of the Moon is a science fiction novel by American writer William Gray Beyer, originally serialized in the magazine Argosy in 1939. It was published in book form in 1950 by Gnome Press in an edition of 5,000.

Plot introduction
The novel is a space opera about a contemporary man who awakens in the far future.

Reception
Boucher and McComas gave Minions a mixed review, describing it as "a conventional enough sleeper-wakes-into-retrograde-world story, but told with a fine blend of high romantic adventure and lively absurdity.". Damon Knight found the novel an "old-style romance, somewhat the worse for wear". P. Schuyler Miller declared that the author's treatment of "Omega, [the] puckish, hammish disembodied superintelligence, last survivor of the lunar race of whatsits," sets the novel apart from the routine.

References

Sources

External links 
 

1939 American novels
1939 science fiction novels
American science fiction novels
Space opera novels
Novels set on the Moon
Works originally published in Argosy (magazine)
Novels first published in serial form
Gnome Press books